Songs for the Shepherd is the fifth album released by American contemporary Christian music pianist and singer Keith Green. It is the last album which had been completed prior to his death in a plane crash in July 1982.

Track listing
 "The Lord Is My Shepherd" (Keith Green) –  4:13
 "You Are the One" (Keith & Melody Green) – 2:39
 "How Majestic Is Thy Name" (Keith Green) – 4:02
 "Draw Me" (Keith & Melody Green) – 3:49
 "Glory, Lord Jesus" (Keith Green) – 3:20
 "There Is a Redeemer" (Melody Green) – 3:09 
 "The Promise Song" (Keith Green) – 3:21
 "Until That Final Day" (Keith Green) – 4:39
 "Jesus Is the Lord of All" (Keith Green) – 2:32
 "O God Our Lord" (Keith Green) – 3:50
 "I Will Give Thanks to the Lord" (Keith & Melody Green) – 1:47
 "Holy, Holy, Holy" (Dykes & Heber) – 3:40

References

External links
 Keith Green discography

1982 albums
Keith Green albums